Bornova Anglican Cemetery also known as The English Churchyard of St. Mary Magdalene is a historic English Protestant cemetery in Izmir, Turkey.
The cemetery is approximately 6 kilometres north of the city centre in a district called  Bornova.

History and description
The cemetery was consecrated by the  Bishop of Gibraltar on May 3, 1875. It is in a built up area with apartment blocks overlooking. The red painted front wall and white cross should easily be viewed from the main road. This civil cemetery contains three  Commonwealth burials of the  Second World War. The burial ground is still used as cemetery and accepting new burials, there are however criteria concerning burial here, linking the person to Bornova usually. Unlike virtually all other cemeteries of any denomination, this burial ground is still under private ownership allowing the management to be affected by its own cemetery council with the council only being in charge of tree pruning. Unfortunately the graveyard has suffered considerable desecration in the 1980s and 90s, now halted with a resident guard.

Merchant and botanist Edward Whittall (1851–1917) is buried here.

See also
 St. John the Evangelist's Anglican Church, Izmir

References

External links
 CWGC
 Levantineheritage
 

Cemeteries in İzmir
Anglican cemeteries in Turkey
Bornova District
1875 establishments in the Ottoman Empire
Cemeteries established in the 1870s